Isaria is a genus of fungi mostly in the order Hypocreales and family Clavicipitaceae, or by some authorities the Cordycipitaceae.  It includes a large number of entomopathogenic species, some of them exploited as biopesticides (e.g. I. fumosorosea): often previously assigned to the genus Paecilomyces.

The teleomorph of this genus appears to be Ophiocordyceps.

Species
The Encyclopaedia of Life lists the following species:

References

 

Clavicipitaceae
Biological pest control
Taxa named by Christiaan Hendrik Persoon
Hypocreales genera